Valentine Romney (1718 – December 1773) was an English cricketer who played during the 1740s. Considered a specialist batsman, he was mainly associated with Kent sides but also played for England sides. Information about his career is limited by a lack of surviving data, although he is known to have made 11 single wicket and 14 eleven-a-side appearances between 1743 and 1751.

Cricket career

First mention
The first definite mention of Val Romney is dated 11 July 1743, when he took part in a single wicket "threes" match at the Artillery Ground and the six players were stated to be "the best in England". They were William Hodsoll, John Cutbush and Romney playing as Three of Kent; and Richard Newland, William Sawyer and John Bryant playing as Three of All-England. Hodsoll and Newland were the captains. Kent won by 2 runs. The London Evening Post says the crowd was computed (sic) to be 10,000. A return match was arranged at Sevenoaks Vine on 27 July but "it did not come off".

1744 to 1745
Romney was lauded as a "mighty play'r" in Cricket, An Heroic Poem (1745) by James Love. This poem was written to commemorate a celebrated match between Kent and All-England at the Artillery Ground on 18 June 1744, in which Romney was captain of the Kent XI. In August and September of the same year, Romney played for the London Cricket Club in three matches against Surrey.

At the end of the 1744 season, Romney played in two "threes" matches at the Artillery Ground. The first was billed as "Long Robin's Side v Richard Newland's Side", the teams being Robert Colchin, Romney and John Bryant against Richard Newland, Edward Aburrow senior (replacing John Mills) and Joe Harris. The stake was two hundred guineas and the players involved were stated to be the "best in England". In the second match on 1 October, the sides were Colchin, James Bryant and Joe Harris versus Romney, John Bryant and Thomas Waymark.

In the 1745 season, Romney again played in a major "threes" match at the Artillery Ground on 24 June, when he was teamed with Hodsoll and Newland against Colchin, John Bryant and one of the Harris brothers. Hodsoll, Newland and Romney won by 7 runs. Another first-class match took place two days later between Long Robin's XI and Richard Newland's XI at the Artillery Ground. Long Robin's XI, including Romney, won "by over 70 runs".

1746 to 1750
Romney is not mentioned in 1746 sources. In 1747, he played for Kent against All-England on 31 August, at the Artillery Ground; and on 2 September, on Bromley Common. On 5 September, there was a "threes" game at the Artillery Ground billed as "Long Robin's Side versus Stephen Dingate's Side". The teams were Colchin, John Harris and Romney against Stephen Dingate, Richard Newland and Thomas Jure. It was played for sixty guineas per side and the players were especially chosen from those who had played in the two Kent v All-England games.

In 1748, Romney is recorded in two single wicket matches. On 8 August, he and Colchin opposed Tom Faulkner and Joe Harris at "twos" in the Artillery Ground for twenty guineas a side. On 29 August, he took part in a "fives" game at the Artillery Ground in which Tom Faulkner's Side won against Long Robin's Side by four runs. The prize was 200 pounds. Romney was injured but chose to play, possibly because rules stated one was to either "play or pay". The teams were Faulkner, Joe Harris, James Bryant, John Bryant and Durling versus Colchin, Romney, John Larkin, Jones and Maynard.

In 1749, Romney made first-class appearances for All-England against Surrey at Dartford Brent and for Long Robin's XI against Stephen Dingate's XI at the Artillery Ground. In July he played for All-England in a "fives" match" against Addington. There is one mention of Romney in 1750 when he played in the Kent side that defeated Surrey by 3 wickets in a first-class match at Dartford Brent.

Last known season
1751 is Romney's last known season although there is a possibility he may have continued for a few more years. Surviving data about matches in the 1750s is scarce and there was a general reduction in matches, caused initially by the deaths of key patrons and then compounded by the impact of the Seven Years' War. Romney made two first-class appearances in May 1751 when he played for Kent against All-England. Kent, weakened by the recent death of Robert Colchin, were defeated in both games.

Val Romney's last recorded appearance was in a single wicket "fives" match for Kent against Surrey at the Artillery Ground on 3 June 1751. Kent won "although the betting was in favour of Surrey".

Cricket in Romney's time
In Romney's career, the cricket bat was shaped like a modern hockey stick, this being the ideal shape for addressing a ball that was "trundled" along the ground, as in lawn bowls. The wicket consisted of two stumps and a single bail. Bowlers used the underarm style exclusively but at varying pace. The ball was either rolled along the ground or skimmed across the surface by a fast bowler; pitching was not introduced until about 1760 and by then Romney had likely retired.

Legacy
F S Ashley-Cooper says of Romney that "he was a most famous player, his name being found in nearly all the great matches of his time" and that "as a batsman and single wicket player he was very celebrated".

Personal life
Romney lived mostly at Sevenoaks and was employed by the 1st Duke of Dorset as head gardener at Knole House, a post later occupied by John Minshull. By 1768, the Sackvilles continued rewarding him with a Christmas gratuity of two guineas.

References

Bibliography
 F S Ashley-Cooper, At the Sign of the Wicket: Cricket 1742–1751, Cricket Magazine, 1900
 Arthur Haygarth, Scores & Biographies, Volume 1 (1744–1826), Lillywhite, 1862
 James Love, Cricket, An Heroic Poem (ed. F. S. Ashley-Cooper), Richards, 1922
 David Underdown, Start of Play, Allen Lane, 2000
 H T Waghorn, The Dawn of Cricket, Electric Press, 1906

1718 births
1773 deaths
English cricketers
English cricketers of 1701 to 1786
Kent cricketers
Non-international England cricketers